Rachel Sibande (born January 9, 1986, in Lilongwe, Malawi) is a Malawian computer scientist and social entrepreneur. She is the Founder of mHub, a technology hub and incubator for innovators and emerging entrepreneurs.

She is a technology advocate, a recipient of a Google Anita Borg Scholarship. In 2016, she was named one of Africa's 30 most promising entrepreneurs under the age of 30 by Forbes.

Sibande has championed the development and deployment of innovative technology solutions in agriculture, public health, election monitoring, citizen engagement, disaster management and Digital Financial Services in 18 countries. She has over ten years of industry experience spanning academia, development and social enterprise domains.

Early life and education 
At age 15, she attended the University of Malawi's Chancellor College. She graduated with a bachelor's degree, majoring in computer science.

Sibande attained a Master of Science in information theory, coding, and cryptography from Mzuzu University in 2007 with a distinction.

She attained a PhD in computer science from Rhodes University in 2020 as a Google Scholar.

Career 
Rachel Sibande serves as Senior Director, Data for Development. She pioneered initiatives to advance digital skills among children, girls, youth, and women. She has previously served as Director for USA-based non-profit entities ACDI/VOCA, Agribusiness Systems International, and Palladium Group on socio-economic growth projects in East Africa.

Honors and awards 
 2019: Recipient of 'Forbes Woman Africa Gen Y Award', at the Forbes Africa Woman Summit, South Africa
 2019: New Wealth Creator, Forbes Woman Africa, South Africa
 2018: Won Climate-Smart track innovate to invent award at the Next Einstein Forum (NEF) Global Gathering in Rwanda for creating a thermal chemical process that generates light for rural microgrids.
 2016: Malawi's Ambassador to the Next Einstein Forum (NEF), Senegal
 2015:Google Anita Borg Scholarship, London
 2012:Young African Leaders Initiative (YALI), Washington DC

Personal life 
Sibande is married to Chrispine Sibande, a Malawian human rights lawyer. They have three children.

References 

1986 births
Living people
Malawian women computer scientists
People from Lilongwe
University of Málaga alumni
Mzuzu University alumni